Niederwartha station is a railway station in the Niederwartha district in the capital city of Dresden, Saxony, Germany.

References

Niederwartha